Satopanth Tal is a lake in Uttarakhand, India, located in the midst of snow-capped peaks at an altitude of  above sea-level.  The lake is considered to be of religious significance to the local people; residents of Mana village throw the ashes of the dead in the lake.

Geography 

Located in the midst of snow-capped peaks at an altitude of 16,000 feet from sea level, Satopanth Tal is 22 km ahead of Badrinath. Balakun Peak, Kuber Top, Mt. Nilkantha, and Mt. Swargarohini are the peaks visible en route. The lake remains under snow from the end of September to the middle of May or sometimes end of June. The normal summer temperature remains around 12 °C in day and 7 °C to −5 °C in night, while the winter temperature may drop to even −25 °C in day and −36 °C in night.

Popular beliefs 

Many people believe that the Trimoortis, viz, Brahma, Vishnu and Mahesh, bathe in the lake in an auspicious day. Also some types of birds are found here, which pick up the pollutants of the lake and thus keep the lake clean. These birds are not found anywhere. The local belief is that they are the Gandharvas disguised, who guard the lake against evils.

Essentials for Satopanth Tal trek

A guide, and experienced porters must be taken. There are no night stay places, so a tent, stove, food and mattress are needed. The trek route is a bit tough and only experienced trekkers should undertake it. En route the Dhano Glacier has to be crossed and en route Chakratirth one sharp ridge has to be crossed.

External links
 http://www.uttaranchal.org.uk/uforums/viewtopic.php?f=15&t=268
 http://trekwords.wordpress.com/2008/11/05/on-the-bank-of-satopanth/

Hiking trails in Uttarakhand
Lakes of Uttarakhand
Glacial lakes of India